Chuck Chambers may refer to:

 Robert C. "Chuck" Chambers, former Speaker of the West Virginia House of Delegates
 Chuck Chambers, the birth name of DJ Funk, a ghetto house producer
 Chuck Chambers (iCarly), a character on the television show iCarly

See also
Charles Chambers (disambiguation)